Anclado en Mi Corazón is the third studio album by Mexican actress and singer Anahí, released on April 18, 1997, by Paramúsica. The album was produced entirely by Peter J. Honerlage and Anahí recorded her vocals in Miami, Florida.

Track listing
 "Salsa Reggae"  – 5:04
 "Anclado en Mi Corazón"  – 3:09
 "Para Nada"  – 3:59
 "Sexy"  – 3:40
 "A un Metro del Suelo"  – 4:07
 "Porción de Amor"  – 3:59
 "Con los Brazos en Cruz"  – 3:10
 "Química"  – 3:23
 "Escándalo"  – 3:30
 "Salsa Reggae  – 7:43
 "Anclado en Mi Corazón  – 4:10

Personnel
Assistant – Ivan Doc Rodriguez
Engineer – Brian Stoltz
Vocals – Raquel Garcia
Engineer, mixing – Andres Garcia
Make-up, stylist – Eduardo Arias
Engineer – Armando Castro
Remixing, pre-production – Jesús Castañeda
Photography – Blanca Charolet
Arranger, mixing, programming, remixing – Ishmael Ledesma
Electric guitar – Daniel Leis
Vocals – Jackie Aguirre
Executive producer, concept – Peter J. Honerlage
Engineer – Mario Altamirano
Assistant – David Rodriguez Jr.
Design – José Ferrer
Vocals, vocal arrangement, dirigida, realization – Ruben Amado
Mastering – Frank Cesarano
Coordination – Teresa Gomez

References

External links
Anahí's official website

1997 albums
Anahí albums
Spanish-language albums